Mohammadi (also Romanized as Moḩammadī; also known as Solţānīyeh) is a village in Haram Rud-e Olya Rural District, in the Central District of Malayer County, Hamadan Province, Iran. At the 2006 census, its population was 152, in 34 families.

References 

Populated places in Malayer County